The John A. F. Hall Manor is a neighborhood of mixed-income housing in South Harrisburg, Pennsylvania. Managed by the Harrisburg Housing Authority, it was named after former mayor John A. F. Hall.

History and architectural features
Built in 1953, there are five hundred and forty apartments in fifty-four buildings, which are spread over forty-three acres. 

The HHA plans to re-submit an application for a planning grant under the Choice Neighborhood Program, and apply funds to reconfigure the neighborhood with more vibrant amenities currently non-existent, and eventually redevelop it in the long term. 

In the adjacent John N. Hall Club House (named after unrelated John Newton Hall, a late civic philanthropist from Camp Hill) is one of the Harrisburg Boys & Girls Clubs of America locations. Also present is a community center with day-care and on-site family services and medical facilities.

References

Neighborhoods in Harrisburg, Pennsylvania